The Indian carplet (Amblypharyngodon microlepis) is a species of carplet in the family Cyprinidae. It is found in  India and Bangladesh.

References

Amblypharyngodon
Fish described in 1854
Taxa named by Pieter Bleeker